Rami Saari (b. 17 September 1963, Petah Tikva, Israel) is an Israeli poet, translator, linguist and literary critic.

Biography
Saari studied Semitic and Uralic languages at the Universities of Helsinki, Budapest and Jerusalem. He did his PhD in linguistics at the Hebrew University of Jerusalem. His doctoral thesis, "Maltese Prepositions", was published in 2003 by Carmel Publishing House.

Career
The author has published twelve volumes of his own poetry and translated several dozen books of prose and poetry, from Albanian, Catalan, Estonian, Finnish, Greek, Hungarian, Portuguese, Spanish and Turkish. In 2002-2006, Saari was the national editor of the Israeli pages of the Poetry International website. Saari has won several Israeli literature awards.

Personal life
Since 2003 he lives and works in several different locales. He also holds Argentine and Finnish citizenships.

Awards and honors
In 1996 and 2003, Saari was awarded the Prime Minister’s Prize for Literature.
In 2006, he received the Tchernichovsky Prize for exemplary translation. 
In 2010, he was awarded the Asraf Prize of the Academy of the Hebrew Language for his contribution to the enrichment of Hebrew literature.

Works (Hebrew)

Poetry
 Hinneh, Matzati et Beti (Behold, I've Found My Home), Alef, 1988 
 Gvarim ba-Tzomet (Men at the Crossroad), Sifriat Poalim, 1991 
 Maslul ha-Ke'ev ha-No'az (The Path of Bold Pain), Schocken, 1997 
 Ha-Sefer ha-Xai (The Living Book), Hakibbutz Hameuchad, 2001  
 Kamma, Kamma Milxama (So Much, So Much War), Hakibbutz Hameuchad, 2002 
 Ha-Shogun ha-Xamishi (The Fifth Shogun), Hakibbutz Hameuchad, 2005 
 Tab'ot ha-Shanim (Rings of the Years), Hakibbutz Hameuchad, 2008 
 Mavo le-Valshanut Minit (Introduction to Sexual Linguistics), Carmel, 2013 
 Bnei Kafavis u-Nkhadav (Cavafy's Sons and Grandsons), Carmel, 2015 
 Mesarim mi-Loikhpatlistan (Messages from Icouldntcarelessland), Carmel, 2016
 Doktor Yosefa ve-ha-pitgamim (Dr. Josepha and the Proverbs), Carmel, 2019
 Enzimim ba-nefesh ve-yamim ke-tiqqunam (Enzymes in the soul and regularized times), Carmel, 2021

Doctoral thesis
 Milot ha-Yakhas ha-Malteziyot (Maltese Prepositions), Carmel, 2003

References

External links
https://www.ramisaari.com/rami-saari/ Saari's official web-site
http://library.osu.edu/projects/hebrew-lexicon/00198 Modern Hebrew Literature
http://www.haaretz.com/culture/arts-leisure/a-head-in-1-001-places-a-body-in-one-1.420744 - An interview with the poet and translator
  An interview in Spanish made by the journalist Maya Siminovich where Rami Saari talks about his literary work (April 2019).

1963 births
Living people
Israeli poets
Translators to Hebrew
Translators from Albanian
Translators from Catalan
Translators from Estonian
Translators from Finnish
Translators from Greek
Translators from Hungarian
Translators from Portuguese
Spanish–Hebrew translators
Translators from Turkish
Linguists from Israel
Israeli translators
Hebrew-language poets
Modern Hebrew writers
Israeli LGBT poets
Argentine people of Israeli descent
Finnish people of Israeli descent
Recipients of Prime Minister's Prize for Hebrew Literary Works
Naturalized citizens of Finland